Shyamal Mondal is an Indian politician and was Minister of State for Sunderban Affairs (Independent Charge) and the Minister of State for Irrigation and Waterways in the Government of West Bengal. He is also an MLA, elected from the Canning Paschim constituency in the 2011 West Bengal state assembly election.

He was dropped from the ministry in a reshuffle in November 2012.

References 

West Bengal politicians
Living people
State cabinet ministers of West Bengal
Year of birth missing (living people)
West Bengal MLAs 2016–2021